The 1933–34 Kentucky Wildcats men's basketball team represented the University of Kentucky in intercollegiate basketball during the 1933–34 season. The team finished the season with a 16–1 record and was retroactively named the national champion by the Premo-Porretta Power Poll.

References

Kentucky Wildcats men's basketball seasons
Kentucky
NCAA Division I men's basketball tournament championship seasons
Kentucky Wildcats Men's Basketball Team
Kentucky Wildcats Men's Basketball Team